Charlie Hannaford may refer to:
 Charlie Hannaford (footballer)
 Charlie Hannaford (rugby union)